Tyler Sanders (February 25, 2004 – June 16, 2022) was an American actor.

He began acting when he was 10 years old. In 2017, he booked his first TV role as the younger version of Jake Otto in Fear the Walking Dead. Later, his role was achieved to fame such as Just Add Magic: Mystery City, for which he was nominated for the Daytime Emmy Award for Outstanding Principal Performance in a Children's Program in 2021. His final performance was in an episode of 9-1-1: Lone Star that aired on April 18, 2022. The 2022 film The Price We Pay, in which he played the role of Danny, premiered at FrightFest 2022 on August 26, 2022, and is dedicated to his memory.

He died at his home in Los Angeles on June 16, 2022, at aged 18, following accidental fentanyl overdose.

Nominations

References

External links 
 

2004 births
2022 deaths
21st-century American male actors
American male child actors
American male film actors
American male television actors